The 2020 American League Wild Card Series were four best-of-three series in Major League Baseball (MLB) to determine participating teams in the 2020 American League Division Series. Due to the COVID-19 pandemic, MLB expanded the postseason instead of holding the regular Wild Card Game for each league. All games for each series were played at the higher seeded team's home ballpark.

The matchups were:
 (1) Tampa Bay Rays (East Division champions) vs. (8) Toronto Blue Jays (second Wild Card): Rays won series, 2–0
 (2) Oakland Athletics (West Division champions) vs. (7) Chicago White Sox (first Wild Card): Athletics won series, 2–1
 (3) Minnesota Twins (Central Division champions) vs. (6) Houston Astros (West Division 2nd place): Astros won series, 2–0
 (4) Cleveland Indians (Central Division 2nd place) vs. (5) New York Yankees (East Division 2nd place) Yankees won series, 2–0

Background
On September 15, 2020, MLB announced the playoff bracket for the 2020 season, which was shortened to 60 regular season games due to the COVID-19 pandemic. The postseason consisted of eight teams from each league: the top two teams from each division, plus the teams from each division with the next two best records. The Wild Card Series were best-of-three series, as opposed to the play-in game format of the Wild Card Game from previous seasons, while the Division Series, League Championship Series, and World Series were their normal lengths. All Wild Card Series games were played at the home field of the higher seeded team.

Matchups

Tampa Bay Rays vs. Toronto Blue Jays

Oakland Athletics vs. Chicago White Sox

Minnesota Twins vs. Houston Astros

Cleveland Indians vs. New York Yankees

Tampa Bay vs. Toronto

This is the first postseason series between the Rays and Blue Jays.

Game 1

Game 1 was a low-scoring affair as both teams were held scoreless through the first three innings by Matt Shoemaker and Blake Snell. The Rays put the first run on the board after Randy Arozarena scored from third on a wild pitch from Robbie Ray in the fourth. Snell would pitch into the sixth, getting lifted for reliever Diego Castillo after  scoreless innings and nine strikeouts. Manuel Margot padded the Rays' lead in the seventh with a two-run homer and the bullpen limited the Blue Jays to a Bo Bichette sac fly to win the game and take a 1-0 series lead.

Game 2

Facing elimination, the Blue Jays tasked Hyun-jin Ryu with keeping their season alive while the Rays turned to Tyler Glasnow to send them to the ALDS. The Rays jumped on Ryu early, starting off the game with three consecutive singles before Manuel Margot drove in the game's first run with an RBI single. The Rays then knocked Ryu out of the game in the second after a Mike Zunino two run homer and a Hunter Renfroe grand slam put up a six spot in the inning. Glasnow shut down the Blue Jays offense, striking out eight over six innings. Danny Jansen would provide the only offense for the Blue Jays with two solo home runs in the third and fifth, but the Rays bullpen would keep the game well out of reach for an 8-2 win and a 2-0 series win.

Oakland vs. Chicago

This is the first postseason series between the Athletics and White Sox.

Game 1

Lucas Giolito was tabbed as the Game 1 starter in the White Sox' first postseason game since 2008 while Jesús Luzardo started for the A's. The White Sox struck first with an Adam Engel solo shot in the second inning and a two-run shot by José Abreu in the third. Luzardo was lifted in the fourth for J.B. Wendelken finishing his day with three runs and five strikeouts over  innings pitched. Yasmani Grandal padded the lead with a solo shot in the eighth while Giolito cruised through seven innings, striking out eight, before allowing two baserunners to lead off the bottom of the inning. Evan Marshall came on in relief and gave up one run on a Ramón Laureano fielder's choice before closing out the inning. Álex Colomé pitched a perfect ninth to close out the game and give the White Sox a 1-0 series lead. This was the White Sox' first postseason win since Game 3 of the 2008 ALDS.

Game 2

Dallas Keuchel and Chris Bassitt squared off in Game 2. The Athletics struck first in the bottom of the first when Nick Madrigal mishandled a Matt Olson grounder that allowed two runs to score in the first inning. It was the first time Keuchel had been scored on in the first inning all season. Marcus Semien launched a two run home run in the second and Khris Davis followed up with a solo shot in the fourth to bring the A's lead to 5-0. Keuchel finished with four strikeouts, six hits, and three earned runs over  innings. Bassitt shut down the White Sox through seven innings striking out five on six hits before Yasmani Grandal hit a two run homer in the eighth to chip into the lead. The White Sox threatened again in the ninth when Grandal drew a bases loaded walk to bring the game within two, but Jake Diekman got José Abreu to ground out to end the game and hang on for a series-tying victory.

Game 3

 

Game 3 was the first winner-take-all elimination game in the  White Sox' 119-year history. On the other side, the Athletics had lost nine straight winner-take-all elimination games up to that point. Both clubs opted for a bullpen game as it was all hands on deck with Dane Dunning starting for the White Sox and Mike Fiers starting for the A's. After an eventful first inning with no runs scored, Luis Robert pummeled a 487 foot solo shot to get the scoring started. In the third, Robert would drive in another with an RBI single and Nomar Mazara followed up with an RBI double to bring the score to 3-0. After getting two outs, Sean Murphy got the A's on the board with two run home run off of Codi Heuer in the fourth. Carlos Rodón came in try and close out the inning, but failed to record an out after loading the bases. Matt Foster relieved Rodón and walked the next two batters with the bases loaded to give the A's the lead. The White Sox tied the game in the fifth on a Mazara RBI single, but the A's responded with a two run single from Chad Pinder in the bottom of the frame. The A's bullpen bent but did not break for the next three innings, stranding five White Sox baserunners. Liam Hendriks struck out the side in the ninth to end the game and seal a 2-1 series win for the A's. It was Oakland's first postseason series win since 2006.

Minnesota vs. Houston

This is the first postseason meeting between the Twins and Astros.

Game 1

Game 1, the first time the two teams had faced each other in the postseason, featured Zack Greinke for the Astros against Kenta Maeda for the Twins. Nelson Cruz opened the scoring with an RBI double in the third. Greinke was lifted in the fifth and finished his day with two hits and three walks over four innings pitched. Maeda turned in a strong performance, only allowing two hits over five innings while striking out five; however, George Springer laced an RBI double off of Tyler Duffey in the seventh to tie the game. The game remained scoreless into the ninth inning until the Twins defense fell apart. Sergio Romo got the first two outs of the inning after giving up consecutive singles, but Jorge Polanco overthrew second baseman Luis Arráez on what should have been an inning ending force out, allowing the Astros to load the bases. Romo then walked José Altuve with the bases loaded to drive in the go-ahead run. Caleb Thielbar came on in relief and promptly gave up a 2-run single to Michael Brantley to pad the Astros' lead at 4-1. Framber Valdez, who had taken over for Greinke in the fifth, would allow two singles in the ninth, but induced a double play to end the game and give the Astros a 1–0 lead in the series. This was the Twins’ 17th straight postseason loss, setting a team record for major professional sports in North America.

Game 2

José Berríos and José Urquidy squared off in Game 2. Both pitchers kept the game scoreless through three before Kyle Tucker drove in the game's first run on an RBI single in the fourth. Berríos would pitch five innings, giving up only the one run and striking out four. Urquidy threw four scoreless innings before giving up a lead off single to Marwin Gonzalez in the fifth. Nelson Cruz would tie the game on an RBI double off of Brooks Raley and finishing Urquidy's line at  innings pitched of one-run ball.who pitched  scoreless innings while allowing just one hit. Carlos Correa hit a go-ahead home run in the seventh off of Cody Stashak in the seventh and Tucker tacked on an insurance run in the ninth with another RBI single before the Astros' bullpen closed out the game and the series. The Astros bullpen would finish the series with  scoreless innings, giving up only three hits while striking out ten across the two games. This was the Twins' 18th straight postseason loss, extending their record. This was Dusty Baker's first playoff series win since the 2003 National League Division Series while he was manager of the Chicago Cubs.

Cleveland vs. New York

This is the fifth postseason meeting between the Indians and Yankees, with both teams splitting their first four postseason meetings. The Indians previously won the 1997 American League Division Series 3–2 and the 2007 American League Division Series 3–1, while the Yankees previously won the 1998 American League Championship Series 4–2 and the 2017 American League Division Series 3–2.

Game 1

The first game matched the prime stars for both squads in Gerrit Cole and Shane Bieber, with the latter having won the pitching Triple Crown for the 2020 season. The Yankees took an early lead when Aaron Judge hit a home run on the first pitch he saw from Bieber, who had allowed the leadoff hitter in DJ LeMahieu to get on base with a single. Luke Voit increased the lead to three in the third inning on a double. The Indians countered with a run on a José Ramírez double that made it 3–1, but a Carlos Santana strike out culled the chance for more with runners on the corner. The Yankees responded with a Brett Gardner RBI double and a subsequent LeMahieu RBI single to make it 5–1. Josh Naylor made it 5–2 on a home run, while Gleyber Torres responded with a home run of his own to make it 7–2. The Yankees blew the game further open with runs driven in by Urshela, Torres, and Gardner to make for four runs in the seventh before finishing with a Giancarlo Stanton home run. The Indians closed the scoring with a Tyler Naquin RBI single that made the final score 12–3. Cole struck out thirteen batters in seven innings while allowing two runs on six hits. He was the second pitcher to throw thirteen strikeouts with zero walks and the first since Tom Seaver did so in Game 1 of the 1973 National League Championship Series. Bieber allowed seven runs on nine hits while striking out seven with two walks that saw him last  innings.

Game 2

Masahiro Tanaka was matched against Carlos Carrasco, but neither starter would factor into the final result. Tanaka pitched four innings but allowed six runs on five hits with three strikeouts and walks, while Carrasco allowed four runs on two hits with three walks to six strikeouts on three innings. The Indians led 4–0 on RBI doubles by José Ramírez and Josh Naylor and a Roberto Perez RBI single in the first inning. Giancarlo Stanton made it 4–1 with a home run in the second inning. The fourth inning saw the Yankees take the lead after driving Carrasco from the game on a triple and two walks. Gio Urshela, facing James Karinchak, hit a grand slam on a full count to take the lead. Phil Maton took over after two walks and managed to strand the runners to alleviate further damage. In the next inning, he allowed a run to score on a sacrifice fly by Stanton. Tanaka was driven out of the game in the fifth after allowing a double and a walk to be replaced by Chad Green. Ramirez would tie the game on a two-run double. Triston McKenzie took over for the sixth to pitch for Cleveland. A walk followed by a home run by Gary Sanchez meant an 8–6 lead for New York. Zack Britton managed to garner the first two outs of the seventh before being taken out for Jonathan Loaisiga after walking two batters. Jordan Luplow would tie the game on a two-run double. Loaisiga would allow the first two batters to reach on walks in the eighth and was replaced by Aroldis Chapman. On the first pitch he saw, César Hernández hit a single that would break the tie at eight and give them the lead. Brad Hand was sent out to save the ninth inning for the Indians. He allowed a walk and two singles to load the bases. This would be followed by a strikeout before a sacrifice fly by Sanchez to tie the game at nine. With two outs, LeMahieu would break the tie on an RBI single to make it 10–9. Chapman would strike out three of the four batters he saw to finish the game for the Yankees.

This extended the Indians consecutive playoff losing streak to eight games. This was the fourth time in the last five years that the Indians were eliminated from the postseason at home. At four hours and 50 minutes, this set a record as the longest nine-inning game in MLB history. This was also Francisco Lindor's last game with the Cleveland Indians, as he was traded along with Carlos Carrasco to the New York Mets in the off-season. This was Cleveland’s final playoff game as the Indians before they changed names to the Guardians in 2022.

Broadcasting
The games were televised on ESPN, and TBS in the United States, with ABC showing the first game of the Twins–Astros series and ESPN2 showing the second game. TBS aired the entirety of the Rays–Blue Jays series. Sportsnet, a property of Toronto Blue Jays owner Rogers Communications, broadcast games in Canada.

See also
2020 National League Wild Card Series

References

American League Wild Card Series
Major League Baseball Wild Card Series
Tampa Bay Rays postseason
Oakland Athletics postseason
Minnesota Twins postseason
Cleveland Indians postseason
New York Yankees postseason
Houston Astros postseason
Chicago White Sox postseason
Toronto Blue Jays postseason
American League Wild Card Series
American League Wild Card Series
American League Wild Card Series
Baseball competitions in Houston
Baseball competitions in Oakland, California
Baseball competitions in Cleveland
Baseball competitions in Minneapolis